The Four Seasons Tour is a 2002 concert tour by German female pop group No Angels, organized to promote their second studio album Now... Us! (2002).

Reception 
Local online magazine ka-news declared the concert "the perfect show and added: "The mixture of elaborate dance interludes and sensitive ballads rushed through the Europahalle, so that even the floor thumped with it. The five girls did their thing properly, sorting the songs according to the four seasons." In her review of the concert at the Alsterdorfer Sporthalle in Hamburg, Hamburger Abendblatt writer Conni Schierer called the show "a colorful party."eine kunterbunte party."

Opening acts 

 B3
 Maja
 Pierre Humphrey
 She'Loe
 Sugababes
 Tears

Set list

"Three Words"
"100% Emotional"
"2 Get Over U"
"Since I Found U" (Vanessa solo)
"Still in Love with You"
"Lost in You"
"Like Ice in the Sunshine"
"Come Back" (Nadja solo)
"Autumn Breeze
"There Must Be an Angel"
"Shield Against My Sorrow" (Jessica solo)
"Let's Go to Bed"
"Rivers of Joy"
"Say Goodbye" (Sandy solo)
"Stay" (Lucy solo)
"Lovestory"
"Something About Us"
Encore
"All Cried Out"
"Daylight in Your Eyes"

Notes
"Shield Against My Sorrow" was not performed in Zürich and Vienna.

Tour dates

References

2002 concert tours

No Angels concert tours